The Crefeld School is an alternative school for students in grades seven through twelve, located in Chestnut Hill, Philadelphia.

History and mission
The Crefeld School was founded as The Miquon Upper School in 1970 by Arnold Greenberg. Greenberg, a former teacher at The Miquon School (a private progressive elementary school founded in 1932), created the new upper school partly in response to requests from parents and former students from The Miquon School who wanted the opportunity to continue their schooling in the tradition of progressive education. Greenberg was granted permission by The Miquon School's board to include the "Miquon" name in the title of his new school, but the two schools were always entirely independent of each other. To avoid confusion, the upper school eventually changed its name to The Crefeld School.

Enrollment and demographics
For the 2019-2020 school year, Crefeld enrolled 101 students in grades 7-12.  The student body is approximately 33% students of color.

Accreditation
Crefeld is not accredited by the Pennsylvania Department of Education. However, Crefeld is accredited by the Pennsylvania Association of Independent Schools (PAIS) and Middle States Association Commissions on Elementary and Secondary Schools.

Sexual Abuse
On episode 970 of the WTF With Marc Maron podcast, comedian Annie Lederman discussed her experiences at The Crefeld School. When discussing the podcast on instagram, she said "any parent considering sending a kid to The Crefeld School in Chestnut Hill, PA should know exactly what happened to me.
Besides receiving an utterly substandard education...I was sexually assaulted by a Crefeld teacher. I reported him to faculty, the principal, my parents, and the police. Everyone I was supposed to. I took him to court where he pled guilty. The details of how I was treated at The Crefeld School are in the podcast. Here I’ll just say my worst nightmare is to have a child go through what I did at Crefeld. "

Annie Lederman discussed her experiences further with Michael Rosenbaum on his podcast. When discussing graduating early while being ostracized by Crefeld staff and students, Annie noted "I was in court. I was a problem...she's about to find out about the rest of us that are molesting everyone. They couldn't believe it, that I told on everyone."

Annie Lederman noted in an interview with Dr Drew that she has received numerous reports about other students getting molested. She noted, "The amount of incidents we found are insane...we keep learning more about how deep it goes...how the teachers that were molested were molested by their teachers who were there."

Notable alumni
 M. K. Asante, poet, filmmaker, and professor.
 Eugene Byrd, Actor 
 Annie Lederman, comedian.

References

External links

Crefeld School
Educational institutions established in 1970
High schools in Philadelphia
Private middle schools in Pennsylvania
1970 establishments in Pennsylvania
Chestnut Hill, Philadelphia